Sonatas, duos and fantasies by Franz Schubert include all works for solo piano by Franz Schubert, except separate dances. They also include a number of works for two players: piano four hands, or piano and a string instrument (violin, arpeggione).

Sonatas for piano solo
Twenty-four extant sonatas and sonata fragments are listed in the 1978 version of the Deutsch catalogue:
 D 154, Piano Sonata in E major (1815, fragment; similarity with the first movement of the Piano Sonata in E major, D 157)
 I. Allegro (fragment)
 D 157, 	Piano Sonata in E major (1815, unfinished – first three movements are extant)
 I. Allegro ma non troppo
 II. Andante
 III. Menuetto. Allegro vivace – Trio
 D 279, Piano Sonata in C major (1815, unfinished – first three movements are extant; the Allegretto in C major, D 346 fragment is probably the fourth movement)
 I. Allegro moderato
 II. Andante
 III. Menuetto. Allegro vivace – Trio
 IV. Allegretto (D 346, fragment)
 D 459, Piano Sonata in E major (1816, in 2 movements; also paired with D 459A to have a five movement sonata or five piano pieces "Fünf Klavierstücke")
 I. Allegro moderato
 II. Scherzo. Allegro
 D 459A,	Three piano pieces "Drei Klavierstücke" (1816?, also paired with D 459 to have a five movement sonata or five piano pieces "Fünf Klavierstücke"
 III. Adagio
 IV. Scherzo. Allegro – Trio. Più tardo
 V. Allegro patetico
 D 537, Piano Sonata in A minor (1817, first published as Op. posth. 164)
 I. Allegro ma non troppo
 II. Allegretto quasi andantino
 III. Allegro vivace
 D 557, Piano Sonata in A-flat major (1817; there is not complete certainty that the third movement, in E-flat major, is the Finale of the work)
 I. Allegro moderato
 II. Andante
 III. Allegro
 D 566, Piano Sonata in E minor (1817, unfinished? – first three movements are extant; the Rondo in E major, D 506 is probably the fourth movement)
 I. Moderato
 II. Allegretto
 III. Scherzo. Allegro vivace – Trio
 IV. Rondo. Allegretto (D 506)
 D 568, Piano Sonata in D-flat major/E-flat major (1817, 2 versions; for the 1st version, the Scherzo in D-flat major, D 593 No. 2 possibly constitutes the third movement; the last movement is a fragment; NSA also appends an amended first movement from the 1st version; 2nd version first published as Op. posth. 122)
1st version, in D-flat major [formerly D 567]
 I. Allegro moderato
 II. Andante molto
 III. Scherzo. Allegro moderato – Trio (D 593 No. 2)
 IV. Allegretto (fragment)
2nd version, in E-flat major
 I. Allegro moderato
 II. Andante molto
 III. Menuetto. Allegro – Trio
 IV. Allegro moderato
 D 571, Piano Sonata in F-sharp minor (1817, unfinished – fragment of an "Allegro moderato" first movement is extant. The Piano piece in A major, D 604, an Andante, as well as the Scherzo in D major and Allegro in F-sharp minor fragment from D 570 probably constitute the remaining movements)
 I. Allegro moderato (fragment)
 II. Andante (D 604)
 III. Scherzo. Allegro vivace – Trio (D 570)
 IV. Allegro (D 570, fragment)
 D 575, Piano Sonata in B major (1817, first published as Op. posth. 147)
 I. Allegro, ma non troppo
 II. Andante
 III. Scherzo. Allegretto – Trio
 IV. Allegro giusto
 D 613, Piano Sonata in C major (1818, unfinished – fragments of two movements are extant; the Adagio in E major, D 612 as well as the Minuet with Trio D 600/610 possibly constitute the remaining movements)
 I. Moderato (fragment)
 II. Adagio (D 612)
 III. Menuetto – Trio (D 600/610)
 IV. Without tempo indication (fragment)
 D 625, Piano Sonata in F minor (1818, unfinished – a completed Scherzo with Trio, and fragments of two "Allegro" movements are extant; the Adagio in D-flat major D 505 is probably the second movement) 
 I. Allegro (fragment)
 II. Adagio (D 505)
 III. Scherzo. Allegretto – Trio
 IV. Allegro (fragment)
 D 655, Piano Sonata in C-sharp minor (1819, fragment)
 I. Allegro (fragment)
 D 664, Piano Sonata in A major, Little A major (1819 or 1825, first published as Op. posth. 120)
 I. Allegro moderato
 II. Andante
 III. Allegro
 D 769A,	Piano Sonata in E minor [formerly D 994] (ca. 1823, fragment)
 I. Allegro (fragment)
 D 784, Piano Sonata in A minor, Grande Sonate   (1823, first published as Op. posth. 143)
 I. Allegro giusto
 II. Andante
 III. Allegro vivace
 D 840,	Piano Sonata in C major, Reliquie (1825, unfinished – first and second movements are complete; third and fourth movements are fragments)
 I. Moderato
 II. Andante
 III. Menuetto. Allegretto – Trio (fragment)
 IV. Rondo. Allegro (fragment)
 D 845, Piano Sonata in A minor (1825, first published as Op. 42)
 I. Moderato
 II. Andante poco mosso
 III. Scherzo. Allegro vivace – Trio. Un poco più lento
 IV. Rondo. Allegro vivace
 D 850, Piano Sonata in D major, Gasteiner (1825, first published as Op. 53)
 I. Allegro
 II. Con moto
 III. Scherzo. Allegro vivace – Trio
 IV. Rondo. Allegro moderato
 D 894, Piano Sonata in G major, Fantasie (1826, first published as Op. 78; NSA also appends a discarded 1st version of the second movement)
 I. Molto moderato e cantabile
 II. Andante
 III. Menuetto. Allegro moderato – Trio
 IV. Allegretto
 D 958, Piano Sonata in C minor (1828)
 I. Allegro	
 II. Adagio
 III. Menuetto. Allegro – Trio
 IV. Allegro
 D 959, Piano Sonata in A major (1828)
 I. Allegro 
 II. Andantino
 III. Scherzo. Allegro vivace – Trio. Un poco più lento
 IV. Rondo. Allegretto
 D 960, Piano Sonata in B-flat major (1828)
 I. Molto moderato
 II. Andante sostenuto
 III. Scherzo. Allegro vivace e con delicatezza – Trio
 IV. Allegro, ma non troppo

There are also some possibly lost piano sonatas:
 D Anh. I/8, Piano Sonata in F major (1815, lost or identical to D 157)
 D Anh. I/9, Piano Sonata in F major (1816, lost or identical to D 459)
 D deest, Piano Sonata in C-sharp major (1825?, lost or identical to D 568 1st version)

Piano compositions that possibly were intended as piano sonata movements:
 D 277A,	Minuet in A minor with Trio in F major for piano (1815, alternate third movement for the Piano Sonata in C major, D 279) 
 D 346, Allegretto in C major for piano (1816?, fragment; probably the fourth movement of the Piano Sonata in C major, D 279)
 D 505, Adagio in D-flat major for piano (1818?, probably the second movement of the unfinished Piano Sonata in F minor, D 625; first published in E major in an abridged form as Op. posth. 145 No. 1)
 D 506, Rondo in E major for piano (1817?, probably the fourth movement of the unfinished? Piano Sonata in E minor, D 566; first published as Op. posth. 145 No. 2)
 D 570, Scherzo in D major and Allegro in F-sharp minor for piano (1817?, the "Allegro" is a fragment; these were probably intended as the third and fourth movements, respectively, of the unfinished Piano Sonata in F-sharp minor, D 571)
 D 593, Two Scherzi for piano (1817): No. 2, Allegro moderato in D-flat major (possibly the third movement of the unfinished Sonata in D-flat major, D 568 [1st version, formerly D 567])
 D 600, Minuet in C-sharp minor for piano (1814?; the Trio in E major, D 610 was probably intended for this Minuet; in turn the Minuet with Trio D 600/610 tandem possibly constitute the third movement of the unfinished Piano Sonata in C major, D 613)
 D 604, Piano piece in A major (1816 or 1817; also appears as "Andante in A major"; probably the second movement of the unfinished Piano Sonata in F-sharp minor, D 571)
 D 610, Trio in E major for piano, to be regarded as the lost son of a minuet (1818, this Trio was probably intended for the Minuet in C-sharp minor, D 600; in turn the Minuet with Trio D 600/610 tandem possibly constitute the third movement of the unfinished Piano Sonata in C major, D 613)
 D 612, Adagio in E major for piano (1818, probably the second movement of the unfinished Piano Sonata in C major, D 613)

Distinction between complete and incomplete piano sonatas

Complete sonatas
These works are by all accounts complete and have always been taken as such:
 D 537, Piano Sonata in A minor (1817, first published as Op. posth. 164)
 D 568, Piano Sonata E-flat major (1825-1826?, 2nd version; first published as Op. posth. 122)
 D 575, Piano Sonata in B major (1817, first published as Op. posth. 147)
 D 664, Piano Sonata in A major, Little A major  (1819 or 1825, first published as Op. posth. 120)
 D 784, Piano Sonata in A minor, Grande Sonate  (1823, first published as Op. posth. 143)
 D 845,	Piano Sonata in A minor (1825, first published as Op. 42)
 D 850,	Piano Sonata in D major, Gasteiner (1825, first published as Op. 53)
 D 894, Piano Sonata in G major, Fantasie (1826, first published as Op. 78)
 D 958,	Piano Sonata in C minor (1828)
 D 959,	Piano Sonata in A major (1828)
 D 960,	Piano Sonata in B-flat major (1828)

Possibly complete sonatas
The works listed below are considered complete or incomplete, depending on source:
 D 157, Piano Sonata in E major (1815, three movements extant)
 D 459 and D 459A, Piano Sonata in E major (1816 and 1816?; D 459 is a Sonata in two movements; it is usually paired with the "Three piano pieces" ["Drei Klavierstücke"], D 459 A to have either a five movement sonata or the work as it appeared in its first edition: "Five piano pieces" ["Fünf Klavierstücke"])
 D 557, Piano Sonata in A-flat major (1817; there is not complete certainty that the third movement, in E-flat major, is the Finale of the work)
 D 566, Piano Sonata in E minor (1817, unfinished? – first three movements are extant; the Rondo in E major, D 506 is probably the fourth movement)

Incomplete sonatas and sonata fragments
They can be divided into the following categories:
 Unfinished sonatas with certainty about all intended movements 
There's no doubt about the movements Schubert intended for the following sonata:
 D 840, Piano Sonata in C major, Reliquie (1825, unfinished – first and second movements are complete; third and fourth movements are fragments)
 Unfinished sonatas that have independent movements associated with them
 The five works listed below are by all accounts unfinished, but have independent movements (either complete or fragments) that are generally accepted as forming part of their structure:
 D 279, Piano Sonata in C major (1815, unfinished – first three movements are extant; the Allegretto in C major, D 346 fragment is probably the fourth movement)
 D 568, Piano Sonata in D-flat major (1817, 1st version; the last movement is a fragment; the Scherzo in D-flat major, D 593 No. 2 possibly constitutes the third movement)
 D 571, Piano Sonata in F-sharp minor (1817, unfinished – fragment of an "Allegro moderato" first movement is extant. The piano piece in A major, D 604, an Andante, as well as the Scherzo in D major and Allegro in F-sharp minor fragment from D 570 probably constitute the remaining movements)
 D 613, Piano Sonata in C major (1818, unfinished – fragments of two movements are extant; the Adagio in E major, D 612 as well as the Minuet with Trio D 600/610 possibly constitute the remaining movements)
 D 625, Piano Sonata in F minor (1818, unfinished – a completed Scherzo with Trio, and fragments of two "Allegro" movements are extant; the Adagio in D-flat major, D 505 is probably the second movement)
Unfinished sonatas consisting of a single, incomplete movement 
The three works listed below are by all accounts incomplete and have always been taken as such; only a fragment of the first movement is extant in each case:
 D 154, Piano Sonata in E major (1815, fragment; early version of the first movement of the Piano Sonata in E major, D 157)
 D 655, Piano Sonata in C-sharp minor (1819, fragment)
 D 769A, Piano Sonata in E minor [formerly D 994] (ca. 1823, fragment)

Numbering of the piano sonatas 
For the piano Sonatas, there is no uniform numbering system. There are several reasons for this, including that there is no consensus regarding the inclusion of independent movements as being part of incomplete or unfinished sonatas. This issue has proven to be troubling to scholars and performers of the works, who have to decide which of these movements, if any at all, should be included for a certain sonata. In some instances, it is also necessary to determine the order in which they are to be presented.

A common numbering system, found on recordings and some websites has 21 sonatas:
 D 157
 D 279 ('Unfinished')
 D 459 
 D 537, Op. posth. 164
 D 557
 D 566
 D 567
 D 571 (fragment; including various other mvmts.)
 D 575, Op. posth. 147
 D 613 (fragment)
 D 625
 D 655 (fragment)
 D 664, Op. 120
 D 784, Op. posth. 143
 D 840 ('Relique')
 D 845, Op. 42
 D 850, Op. 53 ('Gasteiner')
 D 894, Op. 78 ('Fantasy')
 D 958
 D 959
 D 960

Unnumbered editions 
The following two editions of Schubert's piano sonatas are incomplete and abstain from providing a numbering system:
Edition Peters – Sonaten für Klavier zu 2 Handen (Leipzig: C.F. Peters, 1970-1974): an edition in two volumes that includes eleven complete sonatas (D 537, D 568 2nd version, D 575, D 664, D 784, D 845, D 850, D 894, D 958, D 959, D 960)
Schirmer Edition – Ten sonatas for pianoforte (New York: G. Schirmer, 1906): an edition in one volume that includes ten complete sonatas (D 537, D 568 2nd version, D 575, D 664, D 784, D 845, D 850, D 958, D 959, D 960)

The following edition of Schubert's piano sonatas is complete, but abstains from providing a numbering system:
G. Henle Verlag – Klaviersonaten (München: G. Henle, 1979-1989): an urtext edition in three volumes that includes all complete sonatas, all unfinished sonatas, and all independent movements generally associated with these unfinished works  (D 154, D 157, D 279/346/(277A), D 459/459A, D 537, D 557, D 566/506, D 568 1st and 2nd versions, D 571/604/570, D 575, D 613/612, D 625/505, D 655, D 664, D 769A, D 784, D 840, D 845, D 850, D 894, D 958, D 959, D 960) . Volumes I and II were edited by Paul Mies and fingered by Hans-Martin Theopold. Volume III was edited and fingered by Paul Badura-Skoda. It includes all unfinished sonatas and the independent movements associated with them, with completions by Badura-Skoda of all fragments with the exception of D 154, D 655 and D 769A. While the sonatas in this last volume carry a numbering of 1-10, this is not a numbering system of the entire sonata output, given that the first two volumes assign numbers 1-11 to the works they contain.

Numbered editions 
 Breitkopf & Härtel Franz Schubert's Werke: Kritisch durchgesehene Gesammtausgabe – Serie 10: Sonaten für Pianoforte (Leipzig: Breitkopf & Härtel, 1888). An edition in one volume that includes fifteen piano sonatas:
D 157
D 279
D 537
D 557
D 566 (1st movement only)
D 568 2nd version
D 575
D 664
D 784
D 845
D 850
D 894
D 958
D 959
D 960
This was the first publication that claimed to print the complete set of Schubert's piano sonatas. This edition has been reprinted from 1970 onwards by Dover Publications. The International Music Score Library Project IMSLP website has facsimiles of many of the sonatas according to this first edition, including the numbering X,1 – X,2 – etc. on the score.
 Wiener Urtext Edition (Schott/Universal Edition) Franz Schubert: Complete Sonatas. An edition in three volumes that includes all complete sonatas, all unfinished sonatas, and all independent movements generally associated with these unfinished works:  
 Vol. 1
 Sonate Nr. 1 E major D 157
 Sonate Nr. 2 C major D 279
 Sonate Nr. 3 E major D 459
 Sonate Nr. 4 A minor D 537
 Sonate Nr. 5 A flat major D 557
 Sonate Nr. 6 E minor D 566
 Sonate Nr. 7 D-flat major D 567
 Sonate Nr. 8 E-flat major D 568
 Fragment E major D 154
 Menuetto A minor D 277A
 Vol. 2
 Sonate Nr. 9 F-sharp major D 571
 Sonate Nr. 10 B major D 575
 Sonate Nr. 11 C major D 613
 Sonate Nr. 12 F minor D 625
 Sonate Nr. 13 A major D 664
 Sonate Nr. 14 A minor D 784
 Sonate Nr. 15 C major D 840
 Sonate Nr. 16 A minor D 845
 Fragment Sonate C-sharp minor D 655
 Fragment Sonate E minor D 769A
 Vol. 3
 Sonate Nr. 17 D major D 850
 Sonate Nr. 18 G major D 894
 Sonate Nr. 19 C minor D 958
 Sonate Nr. 20 A major D 959
 Sonate Nr. 21 B-flat major D 960
The only differences with the above "commercial" 21 sonatas numbering system are in the range 8–12 (starting with whether or not 567/568 is counted as one or two sonatas, and ending where the D 655 fragment is included or left out). It was edited from the sources and provided with commentary and fingering by Martino Tirimo.
 Neue Schubert-Ausgabe, in volumes VII/2, 1–3:
 Piano Sonata in E major, D 157
 Piano Sonata in C major, D 279
 Piano Sonata in E major, D 459
 Piano Sonata in A minor, D 537
 Piano Sonata in A-flat major, D 557
 Piano Sonata in E minor, D 566
 a. Piano Sonata in D-flat major, D 568 – b. Piano Sonata in E-flat major, D 568
 Scherzo and allegro 
 Piano Sonata in B major, D 575
 Piano Sonata in F minor, D 625
 Piano Sonata in A major, D 664
 Piano Sonata in A minor, D 784
 Piano Sonata in C major, D 840
 Piano Sonata in A minor, D 845
 Piano Sonata in D major, D 850
 Piano Sonata in G major, D 894
 Piano Sonata in C minor, D 958
 Piano Sonata in A major, D 959
 Piano Sonata in B-flat major, D 960

Other numbering systems 
In addition to the numbering systems found in the above named editions, one more can be cited. This numbering system can be found in two websites:
 "Schubert: Catalogo delle composizioni" at 
 "Franz Schubert Catalogue: 610 - Oeuvres pour piano" at 
This is a system in which twenty-three sonatas and fragments are numbered. In this system D 769A is numbered as No. 4.

Fantasies for piano solo
 D 2 E, Fantasy in C minor for piano [formerly D 993] (1811)
 D 605, Fantasy in C major for piano (1821–23, fragment)
 D 605A,	Fantasy in C major for piano, Grazer Fantasy (1818?)
 D 760, 	Fantasy in C major for piano, Wanderer Fantasy (1822, first published as Op. 15)
 I. Allegro con fuoco ma non troppo
 II. Adagio
 III. Presto
 IV. Allegro
 D 894, Piano Sonata in G major, Fantasie (1826, first published as Op. 78; NSA also appends a discarded 1st version of the second movement)
 I. Molto moderato e cantabile
 II. Andante
 III. Menuetto. Allegro moderato – Trio
 IV. Allegretto
 D Anh. I/10, Fantasy in E-flat major for piano (1825?, lost)

Sonatas and Fantasies for piano four-hands

 D 1, Fantasy in G major for piano duet (1810, a discarded first version of the "Finale" is also extant)
I. Adagio - Allegro
II. Presto - Allegretto
III. Finale: Allegro maestoso (an alternative discarded first version of the Finale also exists)
 D 1B, Fantasy in G major for piano duet (1810 or 1811, fragment)
 D 1C, Sonata in F major for piano duet (1810 or 1811, fragment of the first movement is extant)
 D 9, Fantasy in G minor for piano duet (1811)
 D 48, Fantasy in C minor for piano duet, Grande Sonate (1813, 2 versions)
 D 608, Rondo in D major for piano duet, Notre amitié est invariable (1818, 2 versions; 2nd version first published as Op. posth. 138)
 D 617, Sonata in B-flat major for piano duet (1818, first published as Op. 30)
 D 812, Sonata in C major for piano duet, Grand Duo (1824, first published as Op. posth. 140)
 D 940, Fantasy in F minor for piano duet (1828, first published as Op. 103)
 D 947, Allegro in A minor for piano duet, Lebensstürme (1828, first published as Op. posth. 144)
 D 951, Rondo in A major for piano duet, Grand Rondeau (1828, first published as Op. 107)
 D 968, Allegro moderato in C major and Andante in A minor for piano duet, Sonatine (between 1815 and 1819?)
 D 968A,	Introduction, Four Variations on an original theme and Finale in B-flat major for piano duet [formerly D 603] (date unknown, first published as Op. posth. 82 No. 2)

Sonatas and duos for a piano and an instrument

Violin and piano

 Three Sonatinas for Violin and Piano, Op. 137.
 Sonatina in D major,  (Op. 137 No. 1)
 Sonatina in A minor,  (Op. 137 No. 2)
 Sonatina in G minor,  (Op. 137 No. 3)
 Sonata or (Grand) Duo in A major for Violin and Piano,  (Op. 162)
 Rondo (Brillant) in B minor for Violin and Piano,  (Op. 70)
 Fantasy in C major for Violin and Piano,  (Op. 159)

Arpeggione and piano
 Sonata in A minor for Arpeggione and Piano,

Flute and piano
 Introduction and Variations, for flute and piano

Sonatas for three players
 Trio in B-flat major for violin, violoncello and piano, a.k.a. Sonatensatz (sonata movement): an "Allegro" movement composed in 1812 is extant
None of the other trios Schubert composed are indicated as sonata.

Scores
Schubert-Autographs by Austrian Academy of Sciences
Category:Schubert, Franz at IMSLP
Franz Schubert's Werke: Kritisch durchgesehene Gesammtausgabe (= Alte Gesamtausgabe = AGA):
Julius Epstein (ed.) Serie 10: Sonaten für Pianoforte. Leipzig: Breitkopf & Härtel, 1888.
(replication): Franz Schubert. Complete Sonatas for Pianoforte Solo. New York: Dover Publications, 1970. 
Julius Epstein (ed.) Serie 11: Phantasie, Impromptus und andere Stücke für Pianoforte. Leipzig: Breitkopf & Härtel, 1888.
Eusebius Mandyczewski (ed.) Serie 21: Supplement: Instrumentalmusik; Gesangsmusik. Leipzig: Breitkopf & Härtel, 1897.
Julius Epstein, Eusebius Mandyczewski (eds.) Revisionsbericht - Serie X: Sonaten für Pianoforte. Leipzig: Breitkopf & Härtel, 1893
Julius Epstein, Eusebius Mandyczewski (eds.) Revisionsbericht - Serie XI: Phantasie, Impromptus und andere Stücke für Pianoforte. Leipzig: Breitkopf & Härtel, 1894
 Revisionsbericht - Serie XXI: Supplement. Leipzig: Breitkopf & Härtel
Henle (Urtext Edition):
Paul Mies (ed.) Piano Sonatas, Volume I. 1971.
Paul Mies (ed.) Piano Sonatas, Volume II. 1973.
Paul Badura-Skoda (ed.) Piano Sonatas, Volume III (Early and Unfinished Sonatas). 1997.
Wiener Urtext Edition:
Martino Tirimo (ed.) Franz Schubert: The Complete Piano Sonatas. 1997.
 Vol. 1 ISMN 979-0-50057-223-7 
 Vol. 2 ISMN 979-0-50057-224-4 
 Vol. 3 ISMN 979-0-50057-225-1 
 Paul Badura-Skoda (ed.)
 Franz Schubert: Fantasy C major "Wanderer-Fantasie" ISMN 979-0-50057-009-7 
Franz Schubert: Neue Ausgabe sämtlicher Werke (= Neue Gesamtausgabe = NGA = Neue Schubert-Ausgabe = NSA = New Schubert Edition = NSE):
Walburga Litschauer (ed). Series VII Part 2 Volume 1: Klaviersonaten I. Kassel: Bärenreiter, 2000. ISMN 9790006497119
Walburga Litschauer (ed). Series VII Part 2 Volume 2: Klaviersonaten II. Kassel: Bärenreiter, 2003. ISMN 9790006497195
Walburga Litschauer (ed). Series VII Part 2 Volume 3: Klaviersonaten III. Kassel: Bärenreiter, 1996. ISMN 9790006472475
David Goldberger (ed). Series VII Part 2 Volume 4: Klavierstücke I. Kassel: Bärenreiter, 1988. ISMN 9790006472208
Christa Landon and Walther Dürr (eds). Series VII Part 2 Volume 5: Klavierstücke II. Kassel: Bärenreiter, 1984. ISMN 9790006472161
Alfred Mann (ed). Series VIII Volume 2: Schuberts Studien. Kassel: Bärenreiter, 1986. ISMN 9790006472192

References

Lists of (piano) compositions by Schubert
 Otto Erich Deutsch.  Franz Schubert, thematisches Verzeichnis seiner Werke in chronologischer Folge (New Schubert Edition Series VIII Supplement, Volume 4). Kassel: Bärenreiter, 1978. ISMN 9790006305148 – 
Aderhold, Werner (ed.) Franz Schubert: Deutsch-Verzeichnis – Studienausgabe. Kassel: Bärenreiter, 2012. ISMN 9790006315864 – 
Franz Schubert, Thematisches Verzeichnis seiner Werke in chronologischer Folge on-line copy at archive.org
 Schubert Database by Neue Schubert-Ausgabe
 List of works by Franz Schubert at International Music Score Library Project
  Franz Schubert Catalogue: 610 - Oeuvres pour piano at 
  Franz SCHUBERT: Catalogo delle composizioni at

Further reading
 Badura-Skoda, Eva and Peter Branscombe (1982). Schubert Studies: Problems of Style and Chronology. Cambridge University Press.
 
 
 Van Hoorickx, Reinhard (1971). "Franz Schubert (1797-1828) List of the Dances in Chronological Order" in Revue belge de Musicologie/Belgisch Tijdschrift voor Muziekwetenschap, Vol. 25, No. 1/4.
 Van Hoorickx, Reinhard (1974-1976). "Thematic Catalogue of Schubert's Works: New Additions, Corrections and Notes" in Revue belge de Musicologie/Belgisch Tijdschrift voor Muziekwetenschap, Vol. 28/30.

External links
Franz Schubert 31.1.1797 - 19.11.1828
Bärenreiter-Verlag: New Schubert Edition
Neue Schubert-Ausgabe

Sonatas, duos and fantasies
Sonatas, duos and fantasies
Piano compositions in the Romantic era
Lists of compositions by Franz Schubert
Lists of piano compositions by composer